Robert Owen Makinson   (born 1956) is an Australian botanist.
He has published some 65 botanical names.  See also Taxa named by Robert Owen Makinson. He studied at Macquarie University, was ABLO at Kew in 1995–1996 (replacing Barry Conn). From 1993 to 2001, he was a curator at the Australian National Herbarium. From 2001 to 2016 he was conservation botanist for the Botanic Garden Trust, and in 2017 he was principal investigator for the Myrtle Rust project run by Plant Biosecurity Cooperative Research Centre.

Some publications

References 

Living people
1956 births
Australian Botanical Liaison Officers